Hesycha is a genus of longhorn beetles of the subfamily Lamiinae, containing the following species:

 Hesycha biguttata Martins & Galileo, 2010
 Hesycha bimaculata Martins & Galileo, 1990
 Hesycha clavata Martins & Galileo, 1990 
 Hesycha consimilis Thomson, 1868
 Hesycha cribripennis Fairmaire & Germain, 1859
 Hesycha crucifera Dillon & Dillon, 1952
 Hesycha fasciata Martins & Galileo, 1990
 Hesycha inermicollis (Breuning, 1940)
 Hesycha microphthalma Martins & Galileo, 1990
 Hesycha simplex Martins & Galileo, 1990
 Hesycha strandi (Breuning, 1943)
 Hesycha variabilis Dillon & Dillon, 1945

References

Onciderini